Hussong is a German surname. It comes from the French name, Husson (a hypocorism of the Old French personal name Hue or Hugues, itself a variant of the Germanic Hugo, which originates from the Proto-Germanic word hug-, meaning "heart", "mind", "spirit"). Notable people with the surname include:

Christin Hussong (born 1994), German athlete
Günther Hussong (born 1948), German poet
Johann Hussong (1863–1928), German businessman who established Hussong's